Saturday Island  is a 1952 British south seas adventure romance film directed by Stuart Heisler and starring Linda Darnell, Tab Hunter, and Donald Gray. The film was produced by independent company Coronado Productions with the financial backing of RKO Pictures who distributed it in Britain. It was released in America by United Artists under the alternative title Island of Desire.

Synopsis
When a hospital ship strikes a mine during the Second World War, the only survivors are Lieutenant Elizabeth Smythe and Corporal Michael Dugan, who become marooned on an island in the South Pacific, where they slowly bond. Their relationship is complicated by the arrival of a third person, a survivor of a plane crash.

Production
The film was based on a novel by Hugh Brooke which was published in 1935. The New York Times called it "a delightful adventure". Film rights came into the hands of David E. Rose who set up the project in England under Warner Bros. Stuart Heisler signed to direct and Linda Darnell agreed to star, her first British film. Don Taylor was originally set to be Darnell's co star. Donald Gray signed to play the second male lead.

Location filming started in Jamaica on 1 July 1951. The second male lead eventually went to Tab Hunter. Hunter was recommended by Paul Guilfoyle a character actor who heard Heisler was looking for an unknown. Hunter went to see Heisler who asked the actor to take off his shirt. He tested on Saturday and by Monday was getting his passport to travel to Jamaica. Interiors were shot at Walton Studios near London. The film's sets were designed by the art director John Howell.

Cast
 Linda Darnell as Lieutenant Elizabeth Smythe
 Tab Hunter as Marine Corporal Michael J. 'Chicken' Dugan
 Donald Gray as William Peck
 John Laurie as Grimshaw
 Sheila Chong as Tukua
 Russell Waters as Dr. Snyder
 MacDonald Parke as Ship's Captain
 Michael Newell as Edie 
 Lloyd Lamble as Officer of the Watcg
 Peter Butterworth as Wounded Marine
 Harold Ayer as Marine Sergeant
 Diana Decker as Nurse
 Hilda Fenemore as Nurse
 Joan Benham as Nurse
 Brenda Hogan as Nurse 
 Katharine Blake as Nurse

See also
 List of British films of 1952
 List of American films of 1952

References

Bibliography
 Harper, Sue & Porter, Vincent. British Cinema of the 1950s: The Decline of Deference. Oxford University Press, 2007.

External links

1952 films
British war films
British romance films
Pacific War films
1950s English-language films
War romance films
Films scored by William Alwyn
Films about survivors of seafaring accidents or incidents
Films set on uninhabited islands
RKO Pictures films
Films shot in Jamaica
Films shot at Nettlefold Studios
1950s British films